The Mount Henry Bridge carries the Kwinana Freeway and Mandurah railway line over the Canning River in Perth, approximately  south of the Perth central business district. It spans the river between the Mount Henry Peninsula and the suburb of Brentwood.

History 

The bridge was constructed as part of the extension of the Kwinana Freeway carried out in the late 1970s and early 1980s. The bridge was opened in 1982. The construction contractor was Clough, and the project manager for Main Roads WA was Geoff Smith.

Between 2004 and 2006, the Mount Henry Bridge was widened and strengthened to accommodate the tracks of the Perth Southern Suburbs Railway. The widening was carried out by adding an independent structure, which overlaps the original bridge.

Structural details 
The original bridge is of post-tensioned concrete. In cross section it is a double box-section, with the upper deck (including cantilevers) carrying traffic, and cantilevers at the bottom of the box carrying shared pedestrian and bicycle paths. The bridge was constructed segmentally, using a balanced cantilever construction method. The original bridge carried three lanes of traffic in each direction, with two shared pedestrian and bicycle paths on cantilevers at the lower level.

Widening and strengthening 
To accommodate the new Southern Suburbs Railway (now the Mandurah railway line), the bridge was widened and strengthened between 2004 and 2006. Under the new arrangement, the original bridge carries three southbound traffic lanes and the two railway tracks. The new structure carries the three northbound traffic lanes.

Because of the aesthetic requirements, load limitations and limited site space at the approaches, the new bridge overlaps the original in cross section. The foundations of the new bridge are independent of the original, with each pier comprising two columns tapering from bottom to top.

The new bridge was constructed by incremental launching. Contractors were Leighton Constructions. The design team comprised Wyche Consultants, GHD and Coffey Geosciences.

References

External links 
 

Landmarks in Perth, Western Australia
Road bridges in Perth, Western Australia
Railway bridges in Perth, Western Australia
Bridges completed in 1982
1982 establishments in Australia